The Anti-Corruption Commission Seychelles (abbreviated ACCS) is an independent Seychellois government agency formed under the Anti-Corruption Act 2016. Formed in March 2016 after the National Assembly enacted the "Anti-Corruption Law No. 6 of 2016", the agency is charged with receiving complaints, investigating, detecting and preventing corruption-related practices in Seychelles.

References

External links
The Anti-Corruption Act 2016

Politics of Seychelles
Political organisations based in Seychelles
Anti-corruption agencies
Government agencies established in 2016